Heritiera utilis is a species of flowering plant in the family Malvaceae (or Sterculiaceae). It is found in Ivory Coast, Gabon, Ghana, Liberia, and Sierra Leone. It is threatened by habitat loss.

References

utilis
Flora of West Tropical Africa
Vulnerable plants
Taxonomy articles created by Polbot